Leon Patrick Bailey (born 9 August 1997) is a Jamaican professional footballer who plays as a winger for Premier League club Aston Villa and the Jamaica national team.

Bailey arrived in Europe at the age of 13 and played for a number of clubs at youth level before being signed by Belgian side Genk in 2015, where he was named Belgian Young Footballer of the Year. His success in Belgium earned him a move to Bundesliga side Bayer Leverkusen in 2017. After four years at the club, he was signed by Aston Villa in 2021 for a fee of around £30 million.

Club career

Early career
Bailey started his career playing for the Phoenix All-Star Academy operated by his adoptive father, Craig Butler. In 2011, Butler arrived in Europe to find a club for Bailey and Butler’s biological son, Kyle. Bailey caught the eye of K.R.C. Genk in Belgium, but because of the very strict regulations on minors by FIFA, they could not offer him a contract. Bailey almost joined Standard Liège, but the transfer was not approved because Butler had no work permit. Aged 13, Bailey signed for Austrian non-league side Anif Jugend, before moving to FC Liefering.

In the beginning of 2013, Bailey signed a professional contract with Slovakian side AS Trenčín. In October 2013, Bailey reached a verbal agreement AFC Ajax, but a transfer did not materialize due to FIFA rules.

Genk
Bailey joined K.R.C. Genk in 2015 from Trenčín. He made his Belgian Pro League debut on 21 August 2015 in a 3–1 away defeat against Sint-Truiden replacing Siebe Schrijvers after 62 minutes. He scored his first professional goal for KRC Genk on 21 November versus OH Leuven. At the end of the 2015–16 season he won the Belgian Young Footballer of the Year award. His goal in the Europa League against Rapid Wien on 15 September 2016 was chosen as the top goal of the competition for the 2016–17 season by UEFA.

Bayer Leverkusen
Bailey joined Bayer Leverkusen in January 2017 for a fee of €20 million, after interest from Manchester United and Chelsea. He made his debut for Leverkusen on 3 February 2017, in a 1–0 defeat against Hamburg. His Champions League debut came on 24 February 2017, in a 2–2 draw against Atlético Madrid. He made ten appearances for Leverkusen in his first half season at the club.

He scored his first goal for the club on 11 August 2017, in the first game of the 2017–18 season in a 3–0 victory in the German Cup against Karlsruher SC. His first league goal for the club came on 29 September against Schalke 04. He finished the season scoring 12 goals in 34 games in all competitions, helping guide Bayer Leverkusen to a fifth place finish in the Bundesliga. On 30 November 2019, he scored twice in a 2–1 win over champions Bayern Munich, one goal with each foot.

Aston Villa
On 4 August 2021, Bailey signed for Premier League club Aston Villa. On 14 August 2021, he made his Premier League debut as a substitute in a 3–2 loss to Watford. On 18 September 2021, he scored his first goal for Villa in a 3–0 home victory over Everton, in which he also took a corner that led to a Lucas Digne own goal. Bailey's first season with Aston Villa was punctuated with injuries, suffering a hamstring injury in August that ruled him out for a month, a quad injury in the aforementioned game against Everton that ruled him out for another month, another thigh injury in December that ruled him out until February, which was followed by an ankle injury in April which prematurely ended his season - ultimately limiting Bailey to only 7 starts.

Personal life
Growing up in Jamaica, Bailey wanted to become a footballer or a sprinter - inspired by the success of Usain Bolt. Bailey was one of 23 children adopted by football coach Craig Butler, whose Phoenix Academy team Bailey played for as a child. Butler worked cleaning toilets to save enough money to travel to Europe - where he hoped to find Bailey, and his biological son, Kyle a professional club. Since the age of 13, Bailey has lived in Europe.

International career

Jamaica U23
Bailey played in a friendly match for Jamaica under-23s on 8 March 2015 versus the Cayman Islands under-23 side, where he scored directly from a free kick.

Jamaica
In March 2017 it was reported that Bailey would refuse Jamaica call ups until the standards of Jamaican football improved. In September 2017, Bailey told German football magazine Kicker: "They always want me to play for Jamaica, but I've had personal problems with the association since I was eleven or twelve years old". In January 2018, Winfried Schäfer, the former Jamaica national team coach told a German newspaper Bild "I really wanted to make him a national player. I have invited him several times – among others to the Gold Cup in America and to international matches. I also called at Genk. But his step-father blocked everything." Bailey was thought to have accepted a call-up in October 2018, but reneged after demanding that his brother Kyle Butler, who at the time played for the reserves of FC Juniors OÖ in the Austrian 2. Liga, be called up too.

In May 2019, Bailey was named to the Jamaican provisional squad for the 2019 CONCACAF Gold Cup, with Bailey officially announcing that he would accept the call-up and represent the Reggae Boyz. He would earn his first Jamaica international cap on 17 June 2019 against Honduras. Bailey scored his first goal for Jamaica on 6 September 2019 against Antigua and Barbuda, netting the fifth goal in a 6–0 victory in CONCACAF Nations League play.

Bailey was thought to have been eligible to represent England as he has two grandparents who have British citizenship. However, he is not eligible to play for England as none of his grandparents were born in England.

Career statistics

Club

International

Scores and results list Jamaica's goal tally first, score column indicates score after each Bailey goal.

Honours
Individual
Belgian Young Professional Footballer of the Year: 2015–16
VDV Newcomer of the Season: 2017–18
VDV Team of the Season: 2017–18
Bundesliga Team of the Season: 2017–18
Bundesliga Goal of the Month: December 2020

References

External links
 Profile at the Aston Villa F.C. website
 
 
 

1997 births
Living people
Sportspeople from Kingston, Jamaica
Jamaican footballers
Association football wingers
K.R.C. Genk players
Bayer 04 Leverkusen players
Aston Villa F.C. players
Belgian Pro League players
Bundesliga players
Premier League players
Jamaica youth international footballers
Jamaica international footballers
2019 CONCACAF Gold Cup players
2021 CONCACAF Gold Cup players
Jamaican expatriate footballers
Jamaican expatriate sportspeople in Belgium
Jamaican expatriate sportspeople in Germany
Jamaican expatriate sportspeople in England
Expatriate footballers in Belgium
Expatriate footballers in Germany
Expatriate footballers in England